Democratic Party of Vojvodina Hungarians (VMDP, DSVM) is a political party in Serbia representing the Hungarian minority. It advocates for a "personal autonomy" for Hungarians in Vojvodina. It is led by Béla Csorba.

Electoral results

Parliamentary elections

Provincial elections
Following the provincial elections in Vojvodina in 2004, the party had one member in the regional parliament of Vojvodina, in Novi Sad.

On the provincial elections in Vojvodina in 2008, the party was part of Hungarian Coalition, which won 7% of votes in the first election round.

Local elections
In the local elections in Serbia in 2008, the party was part of Hungarian Coalition, which won the majority of votes in Kanjiža (50.91%), as well as plurality of votes in Senta (31.87%), Bačka Topola (46.25%), Mali Iđoš (37.18%), and Bečej (29.63%).

References

Hungarian political parties in Serbia
Politics of Vojvodina
Conservative parties in Serbia
Regionalist parties
1997 establishments in Serbia
Political parties established in 1997